The Mississippi Delta AVA is an American Viticultural Area on the left (east) bank of the Mississippi River, between Memphis, Tennessee, and Vicksburg, Mississippi. It includes portions of the Mississippi Delta and the watershed of the lower Mississippi River in the U.S. states of Louisiana (west bank), Mississippi, and Tennessee.

Since the creation of the AVA in 1984, there has been very little viticulture in the Mississippi Delta region.  Mississippi State University established an enology laboratory to research grape cultivation in the area, but little commercial activity has resulted.  The few wineries that have produced wine from the Mississippi Delta AVA have used native Muscadine grapes. The region has a humid subtropical climate and the hardiness zone ranges from 8b in the south to 7b in some Tennessee portions of the Memphis metropolitan area.

References 

American Viticultural Areas
Louisiana wine
Mississippi River
Mississippi wine
Tennessee wine
1984 establishments in Louisiana
1984 establishments in Mississippi
1984 establishments in Tennessee